GNU Aspell, usually called just Aspell, is a free software spell checker designed to replace Ispell. It is the standard spell checker for the GNU operating system. It also compiles for other Unix-like operating systems and Windows. The main program is licensed under the GNU Lesser General Public License (GNU LGPL), the documentation under the GNU Free Documentation License (GNU FDL). Dictionaries for it are available for about 70 languages. The primary maintainer is Kevin Atkinson.

Comparison to Ispell 
Unlike Ispell, Aspell can easily check UTF-8 documents without having to use a special dictionary. But the mechanism behind is still 8-bit. Aspell will also do its best to respect the current locale setting. Other advantages over Ispell include support for using multiple dictionaries at once and intelligently handling personal dictionaries when more than one Aspell process is open at once. However, Ispell follows the Unix convention of being a command applied to a file, e.g., whereas Aspell requires other command-line options, and the "" option is more comprehensive.  Sample uses include:
 Interactively run through the  checking the spelling.
 Allow typing a word (followed by newline and ) to find words that sound the same.

Windows ports 
, the latest official Windows port of GNU Aspell was still 32-bit version 0.50.3 (Dec 2002), with dictionaries of similar age. The developer says he has "no time and very little interest in maintaining a Windows port", and has been looking for somebody to maintain it.  However, the LyX project maintains a separate fork of Aspell for Windows and dictionaries, and says "the LyX project has long solved the Windows packaging problem by forking Aspell." LyX is being maintained and  the latest version is 2.3.0, dated 16 March 2018.

The regularly updated Cygwin port of aspell can also be used in Windows and it latest version.

Integration 
Aspell has been integrated into software such as Gajim, LyX, Notepad++, Claws Mail and previously Pidgin, Opera, gedit and AbiWord.

See also 

 Enchant
 Hunspell
 Ispell
 MySpell
 Pspell
 Virastyar

Notes and references

External links
 Aspell Homepage
 Aspell Spell Helper
 Test Results of Aspell Compared to Other Spell Checkers
 The GNU Aspell documentation under the GNU Free Documentation License
 GNU Aspell download page (FTP link)
 LyXWinInstaller (includes Aspell for Windows)
 Aspell and UTF-8/Unicode
 GNU Aspell summary page at Savannah
 Mac OS X interface for Aspell
 Original Unix spell (1978-81), on which Aspell is based

GNU Project software
Spell checkers
Free software programmed in C++
Free spelling checking programs
Language software for Linux
Language software for macOS
Language software for Windows